Papaver rhoeas, with common names including common poppy, corn poppy, corn rose, field poppy, Flanders poppy, and red poppy, is an annual herbaceous species of flowering plant in the poppy family Papaveraceae. It is a temperate native with a very wide distribution area, from Africa to temperate and tropical Asia and Europe.

It is regarded as an agricultural weed (hence the common names including "corn" and "field"). As the plant thrives in areas of disturbed soil, it was often abundant in agricultural fields before the advent of herbicides. Flushes of poppies may still appear in fields where herbicides are not used, as well as those in fallow. The corn poppy and its cultivars such as the Shirley poppy are widely grown in gardens, and are frequently found in packets of seed labelled "wildflower mixes". Since World War I, it has been used in the Commonwealth as a symbol of remembrance for fallen soldiers.

Description

Papaver rhoeas is a variable, erect annual, forming a long-lived soil seed bank that can germinate when the soil is disturbed. In the Northern Hemisphere it generally flowers in late spring (between May and October in the UK) but if the weather is warm enough other flowers frequently appear at the beginning of autumn. The petals slightly overlap each other. The plant can produce up to 400 flowers in a warm season, that last only one day. The flower stem is usually covered with coarse hairs that are held at right angles to the surface, helping to distinguish it from P. dubium in which the hairs are more usually appressed (i.e. held close to the stem). The capsules are hairless, obovoid (egg-shaped), less than twice as tall as they are wide, with a stigma at least as wide as the capsule. Like many other species of Papaver, the plant exudes white to yellowish latex when the tissues are broken.

Not all corn poppies that are available commercially have red flowers. Selective breeding has resulted in cultivars in yellow, orange, pink, and white.  The Shirley poppy is a well known cultivar. A very pale speckled variety, derived from the Shirley, is also available.

A nearly black-flowering hybrid, known as 'Evelina', was bred in Italy in the late 1990s, with P. dubium, but does not appear to be available commercially.

Phytochemistry 
Papaver rhoeas contains the alkaloid called rhoeadine, which is a mild sedative. Rhoeadic acid, papaveric acid and rhoeagenine are also found in this plant.

Taxonomy
It was formally described by the Swedish botanist Carl Linnaeus in his seminal publication Species Plantarum in 1753. Papaver, also pappa, is the Latin word for food or milk and rhoeas means red in Greek.

Natural history 

Its origin is not known for certain. As with many such plants, the area of origin is often ascribed by Americans to Europe, and by northern Europeans to southern Europe. It is known to have been associated with agriculture in the Old World since early times and has had an old symbolism and association with agricultural fertility. It has most of the characteristics of a successful weed of agriculture. These include an annual lifecycle that fits into that of most cereals, a tolerance of simple weed control methods, the ability to flower and seed itself before the crop is harvested, and the ability to form a long-lived seed bank. The leaves and latex have an acrid taste and are mildly poisonous to grazing animals.

A sterile hybrid with P. dubium is known, P. × hungaricum, that is intermediate in all characteristics with P. rhoeas.

P. rhoeas topped the list in a UK study of meadow pollen production, on a per flower basis, with its rate of 13.3 ± 2.8 μl. The California poppy placed second with a rate of 8.3 ± 1.1 μl. The pollen production of P.rhoeas, on a per flower basis, was very high in comparison with the other plants tested, at almost triple the amount of the top-ranked perennial (a mallow). When sampled at the level of the entire capitulum, however, it was outranked by the ox-eye daisy, Leucanthemum vulgare, with its 15.9 ± 2 μl measurement. It tied with Cosmos bipinnatus. Neither poppy produced a significant quantity of nectar, making their role in meadow ecology specific to pollen-gathering/consuming insects. As poppies are not wind-pollinated, their pollen poses no allergy risk via inhalation.

Distribution and habitat
The species is found within Africa, in Algeria, Egypt, Libya, Morocco, Tunisia, Madeira Islands, and the Canary Islands. Within temperate Asia, it is found in the Caucasus regions of Armenia, Azerbaijan, Georgia, and Ciscaucasia.
In Western Asia, it is found in Afghanistan, Cyprus, Egypt, Iran, Iraq, Palestine, Israel, Jordan, Lebanon, Syria and Turkey. Within tropical Asia, it is found in Pakistan and India. Within Europe, it is found in Belarus, Latvia, Lithuania, Moldova, Ukraine, Austria, Belgium, Czech Republic, Germany, Hungary, Netherlands, Poland, Slovakia, Switzerland, Denmark, Ireland, Norway, Sweden, the United Kingdom, Albania, Bosnia and Herzegovina, Bulgaria, Croatia, Greece, Italy, Kosovo, North Macedonia, Montenegro, Romania, Serbia, Slovenia, France, Portugal, and Spain.

It grows in fields, beside roads, and on grasslands.
It is hardy to between USDA Zone 8 and Zone 10, or down to 10 °F (-12 °C).

Uses 
The commonly grown garden decorative Shirley poppy is a cultivar of this plant.

The black seeds are edible, and can be eaten either on their own or as an ingredient in bread. Oil made from the seed is highly regarded in France.

The petals contain a red dye which is used in some medicines and wines; also the dried petals are occasionally used to give colour to potpourris.

In traditional folk medicine, it was used for gout, aches, and pains. The petals were used to create a syrup that was fed to children to help them sleep.

Culture 

Due to the extent of ground disturbance in warfare during World War I, corn poppies bloomed between the trench lines and no man's lands on the Western front. Poppies are a prominent feature of "In Flanders Fields" by Canadian Lieutenant Colonel John McCrae, one of the most frequently quoted English-language poems composed during the First World War. During the 20th century, the wearing of a poppy at and before Remembrance Day (sometimes known informally as Poppy Day) each year became an established custom in English-speaking western countries. It is also used at some other dates in some countries, such as at appeals for Anzac Day in Australia and New Zealand.

This poppy appears on a number of postage stamps, coins, banknotes, and national flags, including:

Two hundred lei (Romanian banknote)
Canadian twenty-dollar note (2012) and Canadian ten-dollar note (2001)
Some commemorative Canadian twenty-five cent coins in 2004 and 2008
Great Britain commemorative stamps 2000-2009: 2007 Lest we forget - 90th anniversary of the Battle of the Somme

The common or corn poppy was voted the county flower of Essex and Norfolk in 2002 following a poll by the wild plant conservation charity Plantlife.

China
In China, P. rhoeas is known as yumeiren (虞美人, meaning "Yu the Beauty"), after Consort Yu, the concubine of the warlord Xiang Yu. In 202 BC, when they were besieged in the Battle of Gaixia by the force of Liu Bang (founder of the Han Dynasty), Consort Yu committed suicide; according to folklore, poppies grew out of the ground where Consort Yu fell, and P. rhoeas thus became a symbol of loyalty unto death.

In 2010, P. rhoeas was at the centre of a diplomatic controversy between China and the United Kingdom; during an official visit to China, British Prime Minister David Cameron and his entourage rejected a demand from China to not wear the remembrance poppy, which the Chinese government had mistaken for the opium poppy, a plant that carries connotations of the Opium Wars in China.

Persian literature

In Persian literature, red poppies, especially red corn poppy flowers, are considered the flower of love. They are often called the eternal lover flower.
In classic and modern Persian poems, the poppy is a symbol of people who died for love (Persian: راه عشق).

Many poems interchange "poppy" and "tulip" (Persian: لاله).

[I] was asking the wind in the field of tulips during the sunrise: whose martyrs are these bloody shrouded?

[The wind] replied: Hafez, you and I are not capable of this secret, sing about red wine and sweet lips.

Urdu literature

In Urdu literature, red poppies, or "Gul-e-Lalah", are often a symbol of martyrdom, and sometimes of love.

See also
Poppy
Coquelicot
Remembrance Day
The Red Poppies on Monte Cassino
Corn poppy with lamb
White poppy (symbol)
From Up on Poppy Hill

References

External links

 Malta Wild Plants – Papaver rhoeas

rhoeas
Garden plants
Medicinal plants
Flora of the Caucasus
Flora of Europe
Flora of North Africa
Flora of Afghanistan
Flora of Armenia
Flora of Azerbaijan
Flora of China
Flora of Cyprus
Flora of Georgia (country)
Flora of Iran
Flora of Iraq
Flora of Lebanon and Syria
Flora of Palestine (region)
Flora of Pakistan
Flora of Turkey
Plants described in 1753
Taxa named by Carl Linnaeus
Melliferous flowers